
Kurt von Mühlen (22 January 1905 – 15 January 1971) was a German general during World War II who commanded the 559th Volksgrenadier Division. He was a recipient of the  Knight's Cross of the Iron Cross with Oak Leaves of Nazi Germany.

Awards and decorations
 Iron Cross (1939)  2nd Class (18 May 1940) & 1st Class (31 July 1940)
 German Cross in Gold on 28 February 1942 as Major in MG-Battalion 5
 Knight's Cross of the Iron Cross with Oak Leaves
 Knight's Cross on 6 November 1942 as Oberstleutnant and commander of Jäger-Regiment 75
 Oak Leaves on 9 January 1945 as Generalmajor and commander of 559.Volks-Grenadier-Division

References

Citations

Bibliography

 
 
 

1905 births
1971 deaths
Military personnel from Ulm
People from the Kingdom of Württemberg
Barons of Germany
Lieutenant generals of the German Army (Wehrmacht)
Recipients of the Gold German Cross
Recipients of the Knight's Cross of the Iron Cross with Oak Leaves